The Palace of Depression (or Palace Depression) was a building made of junk that was located in Vineland, New Jersey, built by the eccentric George Daynor, a former Alaska gold miner who lost his fortune in the Wall Street Crash of 1929. This amusement was known as "The Strangest House in the World" and the "Home of Junk" and was built as a testament of willpower against the effects of The Great Depression.

History

Beginnings 

George Daynor claims that he was guided to New Jersey by an angel, who provided the design for the palace. Daynor said that his palace was "the greatest piece of originality ever brought about in the history of Man." He would charge 25 cents for a tour.

Daynor was a publicity hog and claimed to be "the most photographed man in the world." After  Peter Weinberger was kidnapped on 4 July 1956, Daynor called the FBI and falsely reported that the kidnappers had visited the palace. The FBI followed the false claim and Daynor was imprisoned for a year.

The Palace of Depression was linked with another disappearance, that of  William Ebeneezer Jones III, who went missing in 1962; the grounds of the Palace of Depression were dug up, but no body was ever found.

Decline 

Daynor died a pauper in 1964 at a reported 104 years old. After Daynor's death, a fire destroyed the Palace of Depression and Vineland razed it in 1969.

Restoration 
As of 2001, a city restoration project to rebuild the Palace of Depression was in progress. Local companies and individuals were encouraged to volunteer materials and labor. Kevin Kirchner initially started the effort in 1998 and has led the restoration effort since its beginning. It took about three years just to obtain the permits and clear the wooded property before actual re-construction of The Palace began in 2001. As of 2017 much of the Palace building itself has been rebuilt and an adjacent Historical Center/Museum was also erected on the site. The project is scheduled to tentatively take another two years before opened to the public regularly. The Palace is currently open to the public for tours in limited capacity.

In pop culture 
 In 1938 George Daynor made a film about his park entitled The Fantastic Palace.
 The 1983 film Eddie and the Cruisers references the Palace Depression.
 The Trenton rock n' roll band the Cryptkeeper Five titled a 2006 album Rise of the Palace Depression.

Notes

References

External links 
 The Palace of Depression Official Site
 RoadSide America entry
 The Fantastic Palace, a documentary about the Palace of Depression, on IMDb
 Coilhouse.
 Spaces Archives

Buildings and structures in Cumberland County, New Jersey
Great Depression in the United States
Novelty buildings in New Jersey
1932 establishments in New Jersey
1969 disestablishments in New Jersey